CSCS may refer to:

 Centro Svizzero di Calcolo Scientifico, the Swiss National Supercomputing Centre
 Certified Strength and Conditioning Specialist, a professional certification for strength and conditioning coaches
 Chhattisgarh State Cricket Sangh, India
 Colorado Springs Christian Schools, Colorado, US
 Construction Skills Certification Scheme, United Kingdom recognized professional designation
 Coral Springs Charter School, Florida, US
 Cross-Strait CEO Summit, a business summit between Mainland China and Taiwan
 cscs, an allele pattern in cats that results in blue eye pigmentation

See also
 CSC (disambiguation)